Dequeen School District 17 is a school district in Sevier County, Arkansas, headquartered in De Queen.

History
The Gillham School District consolidated into the DeQueen district on July 1, 1986. On July 1, 2006, the Lockesburg School District consolidated into the DeQueen District.

In 1969 the Sevier County school district merged into the Lockesburg district.

Schools
 De Queen Primary School
 De Queen Elementary School
 De Queen Middle School
 De Queen Jr. High School
 De Queen High School

References

Further reading
 (Download) - Includes map of predecessor districts

External links
 
 

School districts in Arkansas
Education in Sevier County, Arkansas